The unidentified infrared emission (UIR or UIE) bands are infrared discrete emissions from circumstellar regions, interstellar media, star-forming regions and extragalactic objects for which the identity of the emitting materials is unknown. The main infrared features occur around 3.3, 6.2, 7.7, 8.6, 11.2, and 12.7 μm, although there are many other weak emission features within the ~ 5–19 μm spectral range. In the 1980s, astronomers discovered that the origin of the UIR emission bands is inherent in compounds made of aromatic C–H and C=C chemical bonds, and some went on to hypothesize that the materials responsible should be polycyclic aromatic hydrocarbon (PAH) molecules. Nevertheless, data recorded with the ESA's Infrared Space Observatory and NASA's Spitzer Space Telescope have suggested that the UIR emission bands arise from compounds that are far more complex in composition and structure than PAH molecules. Moreover, the UIR bands follow a clear evolutionary spectral trend that is linked to the lifespan of the astronomical source; from the time the UIR bands first appear around evolved stars in the protoplanetary nebula stage to evolved stages such as the planetary nebula phase.

The UIR emission phenomenon has been studied for approximately 30 years.

References

External links
 Amorphous carbon and the unidentified infrared bands
 The Infrared Emission Features and HAC Particles
 The infrared emission from dust surrounding newly formed O stars

Infrared
Unsolved problems in astronomy